Battle of Amiens may refer to:

Siege of Amiens (1597) of the Franco-Spanish War
Battle of Amiens (1870) of the Franco-Prussian War
Battle of Amiens (1918) of the First World War